The giant panda is a bear from the family Ursidae.

Panda, Pandas or Panda bear may also refer to:

Animals and plants
Red panda, the only living member in the family Ailuridae
 Ailuropoda microta, an extinct species, the earliest known ancestor of the giant panda
 Qinling panda, a subspecies of the giant panda
 Trash panda, a slang term for a raccoon
 Panda oleosa, a plant species
 Corydoras panda, a species of catfish
 Panda cow, a breed of miniature cattle
Panda German Shepherds, a type of German Shepherd dogs
 Appias panda, a species of butterfly
 Panda Telescope, a variant of Telescope goldfish

Arts and entertainment

Fictional characters
 Panda (We Bare Bears), fictional panda bear
 Kuma and Panda, characters in the video game series Tekken
 Panda, a character from the Hamtaro anime series
 Panda, a character from the Shirokuma Cafe anime series
 Panda, H. Rider Haggard's fictional representation of Mpande kaSenzangakhona, King of the Zulus

Music

 Panda (band), a Mexican rock band
 "Panda" (song), a 2015 song by Desiigner
 Panda Bear (album), a 1999 album by Panda Bear
 "Panda", song by Grace Slick from the 1990 March for the Animals
 "Panda", a song by Astro from the 2011 album Astro
"Panda Bear", a 2007 song by Owl City from Of June

Other uses in arts and entertainment
 Panda (comics), a Dutch comic strip series
 Panda, an upcoming Chinese-Indian film directed by Kabir Khan
 Canal Panda, a Portuguese television channel

Businesses and organisations
 Panda (Finnish company), a confectionery company
 Panda Electronics, a Chinese manufacturer and brand for electronic products
 Panda Energy International, an American privately held company
 Panda Entertainment, a video game developer from Taiwan 
 Panda Hotel, a hotel in Hong Kong
 Panda Restaurant Group
Panda Express, a fast casual restaurant chain 
 Panda Inn, a chain of sit-down Chinese restaurants in California 
 Panda Security, a Spanish IT security company
 Panda Retail Company, a Saudi Arabian grocery retailing company

People

People with the surname
 A. Panda (born 1961), Indian cricketer
 Antonija Panda (born 1977), Serbian canoeist
 B. J. Panda, Indian politician
 Brahmananda Panda (1949–2010), Indian politician
 Prabodh Panda (1946–2018), Indian politician
 Rama Chandra Panda (born 1949), Indian politician
 Sriram Panda (born 1954), Indian actor, director and writer

People with the given name or nickname
 Panda (musician) (Pieter Hooghoudt, born 1986), Dutch electronic musician
 Pænda (born 1988), Austrian singer
 Panda Bear (musician) (Noah Benjamin Lennox, born 1978), American experimental musician 
 Panda Eyes (Oskar Steinbeck, born 1996), Swiss composer, record producer and DJ 
 Panda Punnaiah (1918–2010), Indian industrialist
 Panda (footballer) (born 1984), full name Márcio Gama Moreira, Brazilian footballer

Places
 Panda, Comoros, a village on the island of Grande Comore
 Panda, Likasi, a commune in the Democratic Republic of the Congo
 Pandas, Iran, a village in Isfahan Province, Iran
 Panda District, a district in Mozambique
 Panda Island, a coral island in the Caribbean Sea

Science and technology
 PANDAS, pediatric autoimmune neuropsychiatric disorders associated with streptococcal infections
 PANDAS (Pandora Digital Archiving System), used to manage the Pandora Archive in Australia
 pandas (software), an open source data analysis library for Python 
 Pan-Andromeda Archaeological Survey (PAndAS)
 Panda3D, a software game engine
 PANDA experiment, a particle physics experiment
 Ansco Panda, a camera
 Google Panda, a search-results ranking algorithm
 Panda, a brand of polarization-maintaining optical fiber

Sports
 Rotterdam Panda's, a professional ice hockey team
 Alberta Pandas, the University of Alberta women's athletic teams
 Panda Game, a Canadian rivalry football game
 Panda Global, an esports brand associated with Nintendo's Super Smash Bros

Transportation
 Aero-Service Panda, a Polish ultralight aircraft
 Fiat Panda, a car 
 SEAT Panda, a car
 Geely Panda, a car 
 Panda car, a small or medium-sized marked British police car
 Phillips Panda, a moped 
 USS Panda (IX-125), a U.S. Navy tanker
 Panda crossing, a pedestrian crossing used in the UK in the 1960s

Other uses
 Empanda or Panda, a Roman goddess
 Chinese Silver Panda, a silver coin
 Chinese Gold Panda, a gold coin
 Panda bond, a Chinese renminbi-denominated bond

See also

 Giant panda (disambiguation)
 Kung Fu Panda (disambiguation)
 Pandan (disambiguation)
 Chakulia panda, a sect in the Indian state of Odisha
 Pandanet, a server for players of the game of Go